For the purposes of directing mail, Sweden is divided into a number of postcode areas. The Swedish postcode system is administered by the Swedish Mail Service on behalf of the Swedish Post and Telecom Authority.

History 
Until 1968, mail in Sweden was sorted only according to geographic location, which meant that postal workers had to learn all mail centers in Sweden, and what particular mail trains served those places. In 1967, it was decided that postcodes would be introduced in Sweden as of May 12, 1968. Since then, the postcode system has been essentially the same, but a slight reform was carried out during the mid-1990s as all remaining mail terminals were equipped with automatic mail sorting machines. In 2008, Sweden was divided into more than 16,100 postcode areas.

Format 
The Swedish postcode system is based on a five-digit number combination, divided into two groups of three and two digits. The principle of numbering is that the lower the postcode, the further south the place is located. Excluded from the principle are postcodes beginning with number 1, which represent the capital city, Stockholm. Mail delivery centers are divided into two-, three-, and five-digit positioning groups depending on the size of the geographical place. The two-position group has larger varieties, whereas the smallest belongs to the five-digit positioning group.

According to the system, a space shall be inserted between the third and fourth digit. Earlier recommendations said that a double space should be placed between the postcode and the geographic location and that the geographic location should be written in capital letters. A single space is now the norm and capital letters are not required any more. 

A typical address would look like this:

 Sven Nilsson (First, and last name)
 Roslagsgatan 10 (Street, and number)
 113 51 Stockholm (Postcode, and geographic location)

Two-digit positioning 

The two initial digits indicate city. Stockholm, Gothenburg, and Malmö are designated the two-digit series, one for mailbox- and business addresses, and the second series for street addresses.

The post codes are sorted by geographical location. Numbers starting with 10-19 are part of Stockholm; otherwise, the lower numbers are part of the bigger city areas in the south, and increase northwards.

The third digit in the two-digit positioning indicate type of delivery, in most cases.

The fourth and fifth digit indicate the geographic area. Postcodes with the same first four digits may represent a part of a city or equivalent.

Three-digit positioning 

The first two digits indicate the geographical area in. Previously, these figures indicated the mail terminal that sorted mail for the particular geographic location.

The third figure in combination with the first two indicates the mail delivery location. The fourth figure is the type of delivery.

Five-digit positioning 

Five-digit positioning is used for locations small enough that only one or a few postal codes are required for routing. Since the reform of the postcode system in the mid-1990s, only a few five-digit positions locations remain. These locations are often so small and remote that it is not practically possible to transfer all mail to a larger three-digit locations. Five-digit position locations are usually in the archipelago and in the mountains.

References 
Swedish Postal Act, No. 1684 of December 22, 1993.

Postcode directories with external links 
The last printed postcode directory was published by the Swedish Mail Service in 1996. 
Postcodes may be searched on the Mail Service's website here (invalid).
Statistics Sweden has a detailed table of postcode, region, municipality and city here (invalid).
Postcode look-up and calculation of distances / radius between postcodes in Sweden.

Sweden
Postcode areas in Sweden
Postal system of Sweden
Philately of Sweden
Postcode areas in Sweden